The Aermacchi M-346 Master is a family of military twin-engine transonic advanced jet trainers and light combat aircraft. Originally co-developed with Yakovlev as the Yak/AEM-130, the partnership was dissolved in 2000 and then Alenia Aermacchi proceeded to separately develop the M-346 Master, while Yakolev continued work on the Yakovlev Yak-130. The first flight of the M-346 was performed in 2004. The type is currently operated by the air forces of Italy, Israel, Singapore, and Poland. Since 2016 the manufacturer became Leonardo-Finmeccanica as Alenia Aermacchi merged into the new Finmeccanica, finally rebranded as Leonardo in 2017.

Development
In 1992, Aermacchi signed a cooperation agreement with Yakovlev to provide financial and technical support for the new trainer that the firm had been developing since 1991 for the Russian Air Force in competition with the Mikoyan MiG-AT. Aermacchi also gained the right to modify and market the aircraft for the Western market. The resulting aircraft first flew in 1996 and was brought to Italy the following year to replace the aging MB-339. By this point, the aircraft was being marketed as the Yak/AEM-130. In February 1996, Russia provided initial funding for the Yak/AEM-130 and pledged to purchase up to 200 aircraft for the Russian Air Force.

In October 1998, it was reported that the venture was increasingly becoming an Italian-led effort due to a lack of financial support on the part of Russia. By July 2000, Aermacchi held a 50% stake in the development programme, and Yakovlev and Sokol had a 25% share each. In mid-2000, it was announced that differences in priorities between the two firms, and a lack of financial backing from the programme's Russian participants, had brought about an end to the partnership and that each firm would pursue development of the aircraft independently; Yakovlev received US$77 million for technical documents of the aircraft. Yakovlev would be able to sell the Yak-130 to countries such as those in the Commonwealth of Independent States, India, Slovakia and Algeria, while Aermacchi would be able to sell the M-346 to NATO countries, among others.

The M-346 is a highly modified version of the aircraft that was being developed under the joint venture. It uses equipment exclusively from Western manufacturers, such as the digital flight control system being developed by a collaboration between Teleavio, Marconi Italiana and BAE Systems. In July 2000, Aermacchi selected the Honeywell F124 turbofan engine to power the type in place of the originally intended Povazske Strojarne DV-2S powerplant.  The first M-346 prototype rolled out on 7 June 2003, and conducted its maiden flight on 15 July 2004. In 2004, a contract for the development of a full-mission simulator for the M-346 was awarded to CAE. Further production contracts for CAE's full-mission simulator have since been issued.

In January 2005, the Greek Ministry of Defence signed a Memorandum of Understanding (MOU) to become a partner in the programme, followed by an industrial cooperation agreement between Aermacchi and Hellenic Aerospace Industry in 2006. In March 2008, the Chilean ENAER signed a Memorandum of Understanding (MOU) with Alenia Aermacchi at the FIDAE air show.

On 10 April 2008, the first Low Rate Initial Production (LRIP-00) aircraft, produced in the final configuration (new landing gear and air brake, more composite parts), was rolled out. On 18 December 2008, Aermacchi announced that the M-346 had attained a maximum speed of Mach 1.15 (1,255 km/h, 678 knots, 780 mph), claiming the occasion to be the first in which an all-Italian built aircraft had broken the sound barrier in 50 years.

In May 2008, Boeing signed a Memorandum of Understanding to cooperate on the marketing, sales, training and support of two Aermacchi trainer aircraft, the M-346 and the M-311.

On 20 June 2011, a Military Type Certification was granted to Alenia Aermacchi for the M-346 Master by the General Directorate for Aeronautical Armaments of the Italian Ministry of Defence in Rome. Throughout the certification process, the M-346 development aircraft made 180 test flights, totalling 200 flights across the course of the previous five months, during which over 3,300 test points were completed.

In the advanced jet trainer role, the M-346 is unarmed; however, in November 2015, it was reported that Alenia Aermacchi was close to finalising a combat-capable dual-role variant of the airplane. In late 2017, a series of armed tests involving the AIM-9L missiles took place. In 2015, an armed variant, designated as the M-346 LCA (Light Combat Aircraft), was offered to Poland; this reportedly included a capability of operating the Brimstone air-to-ground missile.

The armed variant is under development, designated M-346FA. The first pre-series aircraft has flown from Venegono airfield in July 2020.

In February 2016, the newly created, consolidated Leonardo-Finmeccanica company promoted the Aermacchi M346 in two new roles: companion training and dissimilar air combat training. In order to better replicate the flight performance and behavior of various enemy aircraft, both the g-force and angle of attack can be independently selected in the flight control system; reportedly, existing customers have stated the type to be well suited to the aggressor role.  Today Leonardo offers M-346 also for Companion Training and Adversary/Red Air roles.

In January 2021 Israeli and Greece ministers of defence announced plans to establish a wide-ranging $1.68 billion security agreement that include the procurement of 10 M-346 aircraft and the establishment and operation of a flight school for the Hellenic Air Force by Elbit Systems, including provisions for simulators, training and logistic support.

Design

The M-346 is designed for the main role of lead-in fighter trainer, in which aircraft's performance and capabilities are used to deliver pilot training for the latest generation of combat fighter aircraft. Powered by a pair of Honeywell F124 turbofan dry engines, designed to reduce acquisition and operating costs, it is capable of transonic flight without using an afterburner; Alenia Aermacchi has claimed that the M-346's flight performance to be "second only to afterburner-equipped aircraft". During the design process, the twin concepts of "design-to-cost" and "design-to-maintain" were adhered to, reducing acquisition and operational costs; the per flying hour costs of the M346 are reportedly one-tenth of those of the Eurofighter Typhoon. Outside of the training role, the M-346 was designed from the onset to accommodate additional operational capabilities, including combat missions such as close air support and air policing duties.

The M-346 incorporates a full-authority quadruplex digital fly-by-wire flight control system which, in combination with the optimized aerodynamic configuration of the aircraft, provides for full manoeuvrability and controllability at very high angle of attack (in excess of 30° degrees). The flight control system, incorporating a HOTAS design philosophy, is equipped with adjustable angle of attack and g-force limitations; when combined with its wide performance envelope, this allows the M-346 to effectively mimic the flight performance of various fighter aircraft operated by trainee pilots or to progressively increase difficulty levels, thus raising the training's effectiveness. A pilot activated recovery system (PARS) is present which, when pressed, conducts an automatic recovery by returning the aircraft to a steady and level flight path.

A digital avionics system, modelled on its counterparts on board the latest generation of military aircraft such as the Saab JAS-39 Gripen, the Lockheed Martin F-22 Raptor and the Eurofighter Typhoon, is incorporated, making it suitable for all stages of advanced flight training and thus reducing the use of combat aircraft for training purposes,”downloading” flight hours from Operational Conversion Unit (OCU) to Pilot Training Unit. A modular avionics architecture is employed, allowing for new equipment and systems to be incorporated and increasing the type's growth potential. The M-346's glass cockpit is representative of the latest generation cockpit and is compatible with Night Vision Goggles; it has three color LCD multifunctional displays, a head-up display (also in the rear cockpit), and an optional Helmet-Mounted Display (HMD). A voice command system is also present, which is integrated with functions such as the navigation system. The communication systems include VHF/UHF transceivers, IFF transponder, and Mid-air Collision Avoidance System (MIDCAS), and Ground Proximity Warning System (GPWS).

A key feature of the M-346 is the Embedded Tactical Training System (ETTS). The ETTS is capable of emulating various equipment, such as radar, targeting pods, weapons, and electronic warfare systems; additionally, the ETTS can interface with various munitions and other equipment actually being carried on board. The system can act in a standalone mode, in which simulated data and scenario information, with threats and targets, is loaded prior to takeoff, or in a network, during which data is received and acted upon in real time from ground monitoring stations via the aircraft's datalink. The ETTS can generate realistic Computer Generated Forces (both friend and foe). For post-mission evaluation and analysis purposes, accumulated data, such as video from the optional Helmet Mounted Display, can be extracted and reviewed. Leonardo also offer an Integrated Training System (ITS), combining the M-346 with a Ground-Based Training System (GBTS) - composed of academic training devices, simulators, mission planning and training management systems - and full logistic service as part of a wider syllabus towards qualifying pilots.

The M-346, in the multirole Fighter Attack variant (M-346FA), is equipped with a multi-mode fire-control radar (Grifo M-346 by Leonardo Electronics) and a total of seven hardpoints, it is capable of carrying external loads up to 3,000 kg while maintaining a high thrust-to-weight ratio; stores management data can be presented upon any of the multifunction displays in the cockpit. The radar cross-section of the M346 in a standard configuration is reportedly 20 square meters; this can be reduced to a single square meter by installing a low-observability kit which has been developed for the type. Other self-protection systems that can be fitted include a Defensive-Aids Support System (DASS) which includes Radar Warning Receiver (RWR), Missile Approach Warning System (MAWS) and Chaff and Flares Dispensers (C&FD). The high-end, net-centric communication suite of the M-346FA includes secure comms and Tactical Datalink, both NATO and non-NATO.

The combat capable M-346FA can perform ground attack, homeland defence and air policing missions and reconnaissance. Various munitions and stores can be carried, including IRIS-T or AIM-9 Sidewinder air-to-air missiles, various air-to-surface missiles, anti-ship missiles, free-fall and laser-guided bombs and rockets, a 12.7 mm gun pod, reconnaissance and targeting pods, and electronic warfare pods; weapon aiming is performed using the Helmet Mounted Display and the multifunction displays. All main systems are duplicated, and the flight system reconfigurable, to increase survivability and functionality in the event of battle damage being sustained. The aircraft has a maximum range of 1,375 nautical miles when outfitted with a maximum of three external fuel tanks, this can be extended via in-flight refuelling via a removable refuelling probe.

Operational history

The Italian Air Force intended to acquire a first batch of 15 low rate production M-346 aircraft. On 18 June 2009, Alenia Aermacchi announced they had received an order for the first six with an option for nine more. In September 2015, the Italian Air Force started their first training course using the M-346 trainer.

The M-346 was named the winner of a competition by the United Arab Emirates at the IDEX 2009 defense show in Abu Dhabi on 25 February 2009. The official said the order involved delivery of 48 aircraft to be used for pilot training and light attack duties. A final request for proposals in 2010 had set the requirement at 20 trainers, 20 aircraft for combat duties, and the remainder would go toward the creation of an aerobatic team. However, by January 2010, negotiations to sign a contract had reportedly stalled over specifications.

In July 2010, the M-346 was selected by Republic of Singapore Air Force (RSAF) to replace the ST Aerospace A-4SU Super Skyhawks in the Advanced Jet Training (AJT) role, based at BA 120 Cazaux Air Base in France. In a press release by the Singaporean Ministry of Defence on 28 September 2010, ST Aerospace was awarded the contract to acquire twelve M-346 and a ground-based training system on behalf of RSAF. As stipulated in the contract, ST Aerospace acts as the main contractor in the maintenance of the aircraft after delivery by Alenia Aermacchi while Boeing supplies the training system. The RSAF holds the distinction of being the first export customer for the type.

The Advance European Pilot Training (AEPTJ) program – also unofficially called Eurotraining – a consortium of 12 European nations to give advance & lead-in fighter training with a common core course and training provided by a common aircraft – has contacted Alenia Aermacchi through the European Defence agency in 2010, for further information on the M-346. In May 2013, Alenia Aermacchi announced that the AEPTJ held a low priority for the firm and that "...progress has been slow."

On 18 November 2011, the prototype, which had been on display at the Dubai Air Show, crashed after departing Dubai on return to Italy.

On 16 February 2012, the M-346 was selected by the Israeli Air Force (IAF) in an exchange deal, in which Israel will build a reconnaissance satellite and AWACs systems for Italy in return for the planes. It will operate as the IAF's main training jet to replace the McDonnell Douglas A-4H/N Skyhawk, which has served the IAF for over 40 years. On 19 July 2012, a contract was signed between Alenia Aermacchi and the Israeli Ministry of Defence to supply 30 M-346 advanced jet trainers, with the first delivery expected in the middle of 2014. The Israeli Air Force announced on 2 July 2013 that in Israeli service the M-346 would be named the Lavi, reusing the name given to the cancelled IAI Lavi. The IAF's first M-346 was rolled out in a ceremony at Alenia Aermacchi's factory in Venegono Superiore on March 20, 2014.

On 11 May 2013, an Alenia-operated M-346 crashed near the village of Piana Crixia, in Val Bormida, between the provinces of Cuneo and Savona, Italy, during a test flight. The pilot was able to eject successfully and survived the crash, but received serious injuries after jumping from the tree where his parachute had been entangled. The type was grounded for more than three months while the cause of the crash was investigated.

In March 2016, Finmeccanica signed a contract worth over 300 million Euros with the Italian Ministry of Defence for 9 Aermacchi M-346, bringing the number of aircraft ordered by Italy to 18.

In October 2016, the Argentine Air Force also evaluated the M-346 as a potential combat fighter to replace the Dassault Mirage III and Mirage 5 aircraft it had retired in 2015, as well as the Douglas A-4R aircraft that remain in service with only limited capability. Argentina is speculated to be interested in 10 to 12 aircraft.

In February 2018, the Italian Air Force received its 18th and final M-346, concluding the force's acquisition program.

On 19 November 2018, Leonardo's Aircraft Division together with Elbit Systems completed delivery of M-346 Full Mission Simulators (FMS) and Flight Training Devices (FTD) to the Polish Air Force (PLAF). This was initially scheduled to be completed by November 2016.

In 2019 four M-346 were delivered to the newly formed Italian Air Force/Leonardo International Flight Training School (IFTS) at Galatina Italian Air Force Base near Lecce.

On 20 February 2020 the president of Azerbaijan announced that the country would buy an undisclosed number of M-346 aircraft. The Azerbaijani Air and Air Defence Force has a requirement to augment and replace its Soviet-era Mikoyan MiG-29, Sukhoi Su-25, and Aero L-39 Albatros jets. The number of aircraft to be purchased is between 10 and 25 (10 plus an option for 15). Azerbaijani military leaders also considered the Yak-130 for the trainer requirement but selected the M-346 despite its higher price because of its lighter weight and higher maneuverability and problems with manufacturing of the engines for Yak-130.

In July 2021, Leonardo made a submission to the Irish Commission on the Defence Forces presenting the M-346FA as a light multi-role fighter and advanced trainer for the Irish Air Corps. The commission has multiple tasks, including determining the future capability requirements for the Irish Defence Forces. Currently, the Irish Air Corps has a very limited air combat capability with eight Pilatus PC-9M training/light attack aircraft. The M-346FA could be a cheaper alternative to more expensive fighter aircraft and would be Ireland's first combat jet aircraft since the retirement of the six Fouga CM.170 Magister aircraft in 1999. In comparison to Ireland's current air combat capability, the M-346FA would be considered by many to be a quantum leap forward, introducing such things as air-to-air missiles and onboard radar.

Polish Air Force
On 23 December 2013, it was announced that Poland had selected the M-346 to meet a requirement for an advanced jet trainer. A contract for eight aircraft was signed on 27 February 2014. The first two M-346s arrived at Deblin in November 2016. The aircraft were initially not officially accepted due to non-compliance with contract specifications. The delivery deadline was originally November 2016, but delays meant delivery and acceptance was not complete until 22 December 2017.

In December 2017, Poland's Ministry of National Defence announced it was seeking financial penalties from Leonardo of up to 100 million zlotys (U.S. $28 million) over the delays. Additionally, the ministry had complained that the aircraft weren't fully capable of simulating certain weapon systems for training purposes.

In March 2018, Poland had signed for an additional four aircraft and support package, plus options for a further four aircraft, and a support package.

In December 2018, Poland signed for the additional four aircraft, as well as upgrades to the existing fleet of eight. Deliveries and upgrade work for the total of 16 aircraft is expected to run into 2022.

U.S. Air Force T-X program

In the United States, Alenia Aermacchi submitted the M-346 for the United States Air Force's T-X program to replace the aging Northrop T-38 Talon, rebranding the aircraft as the Leonardo DRS T-100 Integrated Training System. Alenia originally intended to be the prime contractor, anticipating moving the final assembly location from Italy to the United States if the bid succeeded. About 350 aircraft were expected to be ordered, with further purchases leading to over 1,000 aircraft being purchased overall.  In January 2013, Alenia Aermacchi signed a letter of intent with General Dynamics C4 Systems, who intended to serve as the prime contractor for the T-X bid; however, General Dynamics announced their withdrawal in March 2015.  On January 1, 2016, Alenia Aermacchi was absorbed into Leonardo S.p.A. In February 2016, it was announced that Raytheon, who shall serve as the prime contractor, had teamed up with Leonardo to offer an advanced variant of the M-346 for the T-X program called the T-100.

On 25 January 2017, Raytheon announced that it had withdrawn as prime contractor and American partner in the T-X competition. One of the sticking points had been price per unit: at the time the M-346 had a flyaway cost of $25 million, but Raytheon wanted Leonardo to reduce that by 30%. On 8 February 2017, Leonardo confirmed that it would remain in the T-X competition alone, with Leonardo DRS, its American subsidiary, serving as prime contractor.

The competition was ultimately won by the Boeing T-7 Red Hawk.

Variants

 M-346 Designation for the basic type

 T-346A Italian military designation from 2012 for the M-346.

 M-346LCA (Light Combat Aircraft) Armed variant offered to Poland as a replacement for aging Su-22. Designation no longer in use.

 M-346FT (Fighter Trainer) Multirole variant capable of switching between training and combat operations. New features include a new tactical datalink system and different armament capability, but do not include physical changes to the hardware.

 M-346FA (Fighter Attack)Multirole variant capable of air-to-air and air-to-surface combat with a 3 tonne payload spread over 7 hardpoints, advanced Grifo-M346 radar radar, countermeasures and stealth features including engine intake grids and radar-absorbing coatings on the canopy and wing leading edge. It is being marketed as a light attack aircraft also suitable for aggressor and companion training purposes. The aircraft was revealed on June 18, 2017, in a static display at that year's Paris Air Show. The aircraft is being marketed for export to South American and East Asian countries, and is claimed to be able to carry out operational missions at far lower costs than those of front-line fighters.

 T-100 Designation used for the United States Air Force's T-X program.

Operators

 Azerbaijani Air Force – 15 M-346 aircraft on order.

 Egyptian Air Force : 24 on order

 Hellenic Air Force – 10 M-346 “Silver Hawks” on order

 Israeli Air Force (IAF) – 30 in operation, received in an exchange deal for AWACS and reconnaissance satellites being built by Israel Aerospace Industries for Italy. Locally designated M-346 "Lavi"

 Italian Air Force – 18 designated T-346A, deliveries completed February 2018.
 International Flight Training School (run by Italian Air Force and Leonardo) – 4 delivered as of May 2020.

 Nigerian Air Force – 12 M-346FA on order (+ 12 options). The deal was reportedly $1.2 billion for 24 M-346 aircraft.

 Polish Air Force – 16 aircraft in service, designated M-346 "Bielik"
41st Training Air Base in Dęblin

 Qatar Emiri Air Force (QEAF) – 3 delivered + 3 on order

 Republic of Singapore Air Force (RSAF) – 12 in service, based in Cazaux Air Base, France (Advanced Jet Trainer Programme)

 Turkmen Air Force – 4 M-346FAs and 2 M-346DR/FTs on order

Specifications (M-346)

See also

References

External links

 .
 

M-346
2000s Italian military trainer aircraft
Twinjets
Aircraft first flown in 2004
Mid-wing aircraft